Russell C. Harrington (November 9, 1890 – August 7, 1971) was an American accountant who served as the Commissioner of Internal Revenue from 1955 to 1958.

References

1890 births
1971 deaths
Commissioners of Internal Revenue
Rhode Island Republicans